Nikolay Ostrovsky's Yekaterinburg children railway (other names - MSZHD, DSZHD, Sverdlovsk children railway) is a children's railway in the city of Yekaterinburg, Russia.

The track with a gauge of 750 mm (29,5 inches) has so far a length of 2.8 km (1.7 miles). It has four stations. The round trip lasts 27 min.

It was opened for passengers on 9 July 1960.

It has three locomotives (TU7А, TU10 and TU2 type) and several all-metallic Polish passenger wagons «Pafawag».

Yekaterinburg
Tourist attractions in Sverdlovsk Oblast